Depressaria hystricella is a moth of the family Depressariidae. It is found in Slovakia and Russia.

The larvae feed on Spiraea media.

References

External links
lepiforum.de

Moths described in 1860
Depressaria
Moths of Europe